Sonila Qato is an Albanian politician and lawyer. She is currently the Minister of State for Entrepreneurs of Albania.

Early life 

Sonila Qato was born in Tirana, Albania on 19 September 1977.

In 2001, Qato graduated from the Faculty of Law of the University of Tirana.

Political life 

From 2012 to 2013, Qato served as the Director of the Cabinet of the Chairperson of the Socialist Party of Albania. She also served as the General Manager of Albania's Property Treatment Agency (Drejtore e Përgjithshme e Agjencisë së Trajtimit të Pronave). 

In September 2018, Qato was appointed the Minister of State for Entrepreneurs of Albania.

References 

1977 births
Living people
21st-century Albanian women politicians
21st-century Albanian politicians
Government ministers of Albania
Women government ministers of Albania
Socialist Party of Albania politicians
University of Tirana alumni
Politicians from Tirana